Laylat al-Jaiza or Night of Rewards is the night preceding the Eid al-Fitr. It has particular significance with the month of Ramadan and is to earn rewards for all the fasts and good deeds in this month. It is considered as a blessed night for Muslims and a night to offer prayers and supplications. 
Prophet Muhammad is reported to have said in a hadith in Sunan ibn Maja.

References 

Eid (Islam)
Ramadan
Islamic terminology